"Comportement" is a song by French-Malian singer Aya Nakamura from her debut studio album, Journal intime (2017). "Comportement" received a commercial release solely in France and Wallonia, where it charted at numbers 13 and 40, respectively.

Music video
As of December 2022, the music video for Comportement had over 102 million views on YouTube.

Charts

Certifications

References

2017 songs
2017 singles
Aya Nakamura songs